Cyperus columbiensis is a species of sedge that is native to parts of Colombia.

See also 
 List of Cyperus species

References 

columbiensis
Plants described in 1908
Taxa named by Eduard Palla
Flora of Colombia